Lysosomal Pro-Xaa carboxypeptidase (angiotensinase C, lysosomal carboxypeptidase C, peptidylprolylamino acid carboxypeptidase, aminoacylproline carboxypeptidase, prolyl carboxypeptidase, carboxypeptidase P, proline-specific carboxypeptidase P, PCP) is an enzyme. This enzyme catalyses the following chemical reaction

 Cleavage of a -Pro-Xaa bond to release a C-terminal amino acid

A lysosomal peptidase active at acidic pH that inactivates angiotensin II. This enzyme is inhibited by diisopropyl fluorophosphate.

References

External links 
 
human prolylcarboxypeptidase entry at OMIM: http://omim.org/entry/176785

EC 3.4.16